The Claflin–Richards House, also known as the Claflin–Gerrish–Richards House, is a historic First Period house located at 132 Main Street, Wenham, Massachusetts. It is now part of the nonprofit Wenham Museum and may be toured by appointment (regular tour hours are Tuesday–Friday at 11:00am and 2:00pm and Saturday & Sunday at 11:30am, 1:30pm and 2:30pm).

The Claflin–Richards House was constructed circa 1690 with ogee braces, an architectural hallmark of 16th- and 17th-century English dwellings. Today it contains three centuries of architecture, furnishings, and artifacts, representing a First Period dwelling room, a late 17th-century minister's parlor, a circa 1750 bed chamber, and a Victorian-era chamber. Furnishings include a woolen bed-rug made in 1724, said to be the second oldest such rug in the United States, and an oak dresser built in 1752.  It was purchased by the Wenham Historic Society in 1921.

The house was listed on the National Register of Historic Places in 1973, and included in the Wenham Historic District in that year.

See also 
 Claflin family
 List of historic houses in Massachusetts
 National Register of Historic Places listings in Essex County, Massachusetts

References

External links 
 Claflin–Richards House – Wenham Museum

Houses completed in 1690
Historic house museums in Massachusetts
Museums in Essex County, Massachusetts
Houses in Wenham, Massachusetts
Claflin family
Houses on the National Register of Historic Places in Essex County, Massachusetts
Historic district contributing properties in Massachusetts
1690 establishments in Massachusetts